Desdemona is a character in William Shakespeare's play Othello (c. 1601–1604). Shakespeare's Desdemona is a Venetian beauty who enrages and disappoints her father, a Venetian senator, when she elopes with Othello, a Moorish Venetian military prodigy. When her husband is deployed to Cyprus in the service of the Republic of Venice, Desdemona accompanies him. There, her husband is manipulated by his ensign Iago into believing she is an adulteress, and, in the last act, she is murdered by her estranged spouse.

The role has attracted notable actresses through the centuries and has the distinction of being the first role performed professionally by Margaret Hughes, the first actress to appear on an English public stage.

Sources 

Othello has its source in the 1565 tale "Un Capitano Moro" in Gli Hecatommithi, by Giovanni Battista Giraldi Cinthio. While no English translation of Cinthio was available in print during Shakespeare's lifetime, it is possible that Shakespeare knew both the Italian original, Gabriel Chappuy's 1584 French translation, and an English translation in manuscript. Cinthio's tale may have been based on an actual incident occurring in Venice about 1508.

The only named character in Cinthio's story is "Disdemona". The name derives from Greek , which means "ill-fated, unfortunate", i.e. the antonym of Eudaimonia. Léone Teyssandier notes that it may indeed be how Othello views his wife, calling her an "ill-starred wench".

The other characters are identified only as the Moor, the ensign, the ensign's wife, and the squadron leader. In the original, the ensign lusts after Disdemona and is spurred to revenge when she rejects him. Unlike Shakespeare's Othello, the Moor in Cinthio's story never repents the murder of his wife. Both he and the ensign escape immediate prosecution but are killed much later. Cinthio also drew a moral (which he placed in the mouth of the lady) that Italian women are unwise to marry men whose nature and habitude of life are foreign.

While Shakespeare followed Cinthio's tale very closely in composing Othello, he deviated significantly in some details. He invented Desdemona's father, Brabantio, and her dissolute Venetian admirer, Roderigo. He invented the entire first act in which Iago arouses Brabantio's prejudices against Othello, and Desdemona defends her choice of husband before Venice's Doge.

Shakespeare considerably expanded the role of Cinthio's ensign's wife. In Cinthio, she is simply Disdemona's companion but in Shakespeare she becomes Desdemona's attendant and confidante. In Cinthio, the ensign filches Disdemona's handkerchief from a sash at her waist; his wife is not involved in the mischief as is Shakespeare's Emilia. Later, Cinthio's ensign's wife learns of her husband's villainy in the handkerchief deception but feels constrained to remain silent. Unlike Shakespeare's Emilia, Cintho's ensign's wife lives to tell what she knows of Disdemona's death long after her husband and the Moor are dead.

Disdemona's death in Cinthio is strikingly different from Desdemona's death in Shakespeare. The poet's gentle scene between Desdemona and Emilia while preparing for bed does not exist in Cinthio, and Cinthio's murder of Disdemona is accomplished when the Moor commissions his ensign to bludgeon Disdemona to death with a sand-filled stocking. The two murderers then place her lifeless body upon her bed, smash her skull, and cause the cracked ceiling of the room to collapse upon her, giving the impression that the lady's skull was smashed by falling rafters.

Role in Othello 

In the play's first act, Desdemona has eloped with Othello, a Moor in the service of the Venetian Republic. Before the Duke of Venice, his councilmen, and her father, she proclaims her love for Othello and defends her choice. Her father reluctantly accepts the union but warns Othello that she will someday deceive him. When Othello is sent to Cyprus in the line of duty, Desdemona accompanies him with his ensign's wife, Emilia attending her.

In act 2, Othello's lieutenant, Cassio is disgraced in a brawl and falls from Othello's favor. Iago suggests to Cassio that he importune Desdemona to intercede for him, which she does. Meanwhile, Iago persuades Othello that Desdemona has formed an illicit relationship with Cassio. However many critics argue that the first seed of doubt is not issued from Iago but by Desdemona's father:

It is Desdemona's assurance and confidence in the honor and strength of the love she bears for Othello that inspires her boldness. Yet the passion of her love both arouses and unnerves her husband too, adding to the seeds of fear and suspicion.

When Emilia's husband Iago sees Desdemona's handkerchief, he steals it and forbids Emilia to disclose its whereabouts to Desdemona. Iago plants the article in Cassio's room. Eventually, Othello sees Cassio with the handkerchief and accepts it as confirmation of Desdemona's infidelity.

Desdemona is concerned over the loss of the handkerchief but maintains that its loss will not cause Othello to grow angry. Emilia is more cynical, especially after Othello violently asks to see it. Desdemona is confused over her husband's behavior, which culminates in his striking her in public and calling her a whore.

Desdemona is deeply upset by her husband's attacks but continues to assert her love. In the final act, Othello tells her that he knows she has been unfaithful, and is going to kill her. Despite Desdemona's claims of innocence, Othello refuses to believe her, and when he tells her that Cassio has been killed, Desdemona cries out. Othello becomes enraged and strangles Desdemona, ignoring her pleas for mercy. When her maid Emilia rushes into the room, Desdemona rises weakly to defend Othello, then dies.

Eventually, Othello learns of Desdemona's faithfulness after Emilia exposes Iago's true nature before being stabbed to death by Iago, and out of complete remorse, Othello commits suicide, but only after angrily stabbing Iago (though not fatally) as retribution for his lies against Desdemona. Desdemona's cousin Lodovico then orders that Iago be tortured and executed.

Cuts in performance 
Desdemona's banter with Iago and Emilia at their arrival in Cyprus (2.1.100ff) has been traditionally regarded as distasteful and cut on moral and artistic grounds, being deemed unworthy of a noble tragedy such as Othello and out of character for Desdemona. Today, however, the purpose of the passage is sometimes viewed as a depiction of Desdemona's awareness of the way of the world, and her persistence in pursuing the exchanges as a characteristic innocent overconfidence displayed elsewhere in the play (3.3.41–83, 3.4.90ff).

Performance history 

On 8 December 1660, Thomas Killigrew's new King's Company performed Othello at their Vere Street theatre, with Margaret Hughes as Desdemona—possibly the first time a professional actress appeared on a public stage in England. She played Desdemona in the performance of Othello seen by Samuel Pepys on 6 February 1669. Pepys was present for a performance of Othello at the Cockpit on 11 October 1660, noting in his diary: "a pretty lady that sat by me called out to see Desdemona smothered."

In the eighteenth century, the play was sometimes cut to heighten the tragic nobility of the protagonist. Bell's acting version, for example, omitted several moments including Desdemona's conversation with Emilia before her death—a death which is accomplished in Bells' version by stabbing rather than strangulation.

In the nineteenth century, behind-the-scenes events in the lives of the play's performers garnered for Othello a shocking and sensational reputation. Edmund Kean, for example, suffered a bitter divorce in 1825, and, in 1833, collapsed following a performance of the play, dying shortly thereafter. Edwin Forrest filed for divorce on the grounds of adultery only to be found guilty himself and ordered to pay alimony. Ira Aldridge, an American black actor who appeared in the role, married a white woman. Such events cultivated the play's shocking and sensational reputation, and Tommaso Salvini's savage and sensual performance only enhanced it. In his rendition, Desdemona's death was an especially violent affair. Further cultivating the drama's reputation were the performances of Sarah Siddons, Anna Mowatt, and Ellen Terry who all played the melodramatic role of womanly innocence traduced and overwhelmed to the hilt.

In 1839, Samuel Phelps and William Charles Macready alternated in the roles of Othello and Iago at the Haymarket Theatre with Helen Faucit in the role of Desdemona. In 1881, Ellen Terry performed the role at London's Lyceum Theatre with Edwin Booth and Henry Irving alternating in the roles of Othello and Iago. The production was a great artistic and financial success.

In the twentieth century, Peggy Ashcroft played the character opposite Paul Robeson in London's Savoy Theatre in 1930, and Uta Hagen appeared in the role opposite Robeson in Margaret Webster's production at the Shubert Theatre in New York City in 1943.

Cinema 

In a 1951 film version, Suzanne Cloutier played Desdemona opposite Orson Welles. The film won the grand prize Palme d'Or at the 1952 Cannes Film Festival.

In a 1966 British film version, Maggie Smith played the character opposite Laurence Olivier. The film holds the record for the most Academy Award nominations given to a Shakespeare film adaptation. Maggie Smith and co-stars Olivier, Frank Finlay (Iago), and Joyce Redman (Emilia) all received acting nominations.

In a 1995 film version, Irène Jacob played the character opposite Laurence Fishburne.

There have been numerous screen modernisations of the play. During 1999 Edinburgh Film Festival, Adil Hussain, cast as Othello, fell in love with Kristen Jain, who was playing Desdemona. He ended up tightly hugging her, much to her and the audience's shock, instead of "killing" her as per the script, thus forcing the curtains to be brought down immediately. They eventually got married eight years later, in 2007. In O (2001), Julia Stiles played a character based on Desdemona in a version of Othello set in a contemporary high school. A 2001 British made-for-television film featuring Keeley Hawes as Desdemona "Dessie" Brabant also updates the action, picturing John Othello (Eamonn Walker) and Ben Jago (Christopher Eccleston) as high ranking Metropolitan Police officers. In 2006, Omkara, a Bollywood version of Othello, Dolly Mishra (Desdemona) was played by Kareena Kapoor.

References

Bibliography 

 
 Brigitte Tast, Hans-Jürgen Tast: Orson Welles – Othello – Mogador. Aufenthalte in Essaouira, Kulleraugen Vis.Komm. Nr. 42, Schellerten 2013, 

Literary characters introduced in 1603
Fictional Italian people in literature
Female Shakespearean characters
Othello
Uxoricide in fiction
Fictional murdered people